Puda is a surname. Notable people with the surname include:

Grzegorz Puda (born 1982), Polish politician and local government official
Marta Puda (born 1991), Polish sabre fencer

See also
Pudas
Pueblo Depot Activity, also known as PUDA, a former U.S. Army ammunition storage facility

Polish-language surnames